George Young Kelso was an American politician. He was delegate at Louisiana’s 1868 constitutional convention and state senator in Louisiana from 1868 to 1876. He was a “colored”, “radical” Republican.

Biography 
George Young Kelso lived in Rapides Parish, Louisiana. He gave a statement about voter suppression in 1872. He attended an 1873 "colored convention" in Louisiana. He was part of a Republican parish convention.

Eric Foner documented him as an editor and co-owner of the Louisianan newspaper in New Orleans and as an employee of the custom house in New Orleans who faced the violence during the 1876 election campaign.

See also
African-American officeholders during and following the Reconstruction era

References

Year of birth missing
Year of death missing
Republican Party Louisiana state senators
African-American state legislators in Louisiana
African-American politicians during the Reconstruction Era
People from Rapides Parish, Louisiana
19th-century American newspaper editors
Editors of Louisiana newspapers